The following is an incomplete list of former members of the U.S. college athletic league now known as the Middle Atlantic Conferences (MAC). This includes schools that were members under the MAC's previous identity as the Middle Atlantic States Collegiate Athletics Conference.

One school which had departed the conference has since re-joined: Stevens Institute of Technology, which competed in the MAC from 1922–23 to 1977–78, returned back since the 2019–20 school year, joining the MAC's Freedom Conference.

List of former members

Before the formation of the multiple leagues

Notes

Since the formation of the multiple leagues

Notes

References

Middle Atlantic Conferences

Middle Atlantic Conference